Marko Andić (Serbian Cyrillic: Марко Анђић; born 14 December 1983) is a Serbian footballer who plays for FK Radnički Sombor. He can play as a defender either on the left or the right side.

Career
Andić plays for Anorthosis Famagusta FC. He won 2010-11 Nemzeti Bajnokság I with Videoton FC. He previously played for F.C. Molenbeek Brussels Strombeek, on loan from K.S.C. Lokeren Oost-Vlaanderen, and Lierse in the Belgian First Division.

References

External links
 Profile
 Marko Anđić at Srbijafudbal

1983 births
Living people
People from Požega, Serbia
Serbian footballers
Serbian expatriate footballers
Association football defenders
FK Sevojno players
FK Spartak Subotica players
FK Metalac Gornji Milanovac players
K.S.C. Lokeren Oost-Vlaanderen players
R.W.D.M. Brussels F.C. players
Lierse S.K. players
Fehérvár FC players
Anorthosis Famagusta F.C. players
Nea Salamis Famagusta FC players
FK Zvijezda 09 players
FK Bačka 1901 players
FK Radnički Sombor players
Belgian Pro League players
Serbian SuperLiga players
Nemzeti Bajnokság I players
Premier League of Bosnia and Herzegovina players
Cypriot First Division players
Serbian expatriate sportspeople in Cyprus
Serbian expatriate sportspeople in Hungary
Serbian expatriate sportspeople in Belgium
Serbian expatriate sportspeople in Bosnia and Herzegovina
Expatriate footballers in Cyprus
Expatriate footballers in Hungary
Expatriate footballers in Belgium
Expatriate footballers in Bosnia and Herzegovina